Sharon Bezaly (born 1972) is a flutist.

Bezaly was born in Israel, but lives presently in Sweden. She has been an international performer since 1997, when she began her solo flute career. She made her solo debut at 13 with Zubin Mehta and the Israel Philharmonic. Her flute was made by Muramatsu Flutes out of 24-carat gold.

Appearances
Sharon Bezaly has appeared with leading symphony and chamber orchestras in Japan, China, Israel, Central and Western Europe, England, North and South America, Australia and Scandinavia.  She has also performed at venues including the Vienna Musikverein, Châtelet in Paris, Tokyo's Suntory Hall, and at festivals with Gidon Kremer of the Bartók Quartet. In May 2006, she appeared at Orchestra Hall (Minneapolis) with Osmo Vänskä and the Minnesota Orchestra.

Dedicated works

Concertante
Kalevi Aho: Concerto for flute (+alto) and orchestra
Sally Beamish: Concerto for flute and orchestra
Daniel Börtz: Concerto for flute and orchestra
Brett Dean: Concerto for flute and orchestra
Sofia Gubaidulina: Concerto for flute (+alto, +bass) and orchestra
Anders Hillborg: Concerto for flute and orchestra
Christian Lindberg: Concerto for flute (+alto) and chamber orchestra with solo glockenspiel
Uljas Pulkkis: Concerto for flute and orchestra
Ge Gan-ru: Concerto for flute and orchestra
Mari Takano: Concerto for flute and string orchestra
Haukur Tómasson: Concerto for flute and orchestra No.2
Zhou Long: Deep, Deep Sea for alto flute, piccolo and orchestra
Zhou Long: Concerto for flute and orchestra

Solo
Daniel Börtz: Tinted Drawings
Fulvio Caldini: Bezaly Sonatine
Brett Dean: Demons
Carl-Axel Dominique: Songlines
George Flynn: Attitudes
Hans-Ola Ericsson: Schattenengel

Discography
Bezaly has released 24 award-winning CDs with the Swedish record company BIS. She is married to the owner Robert von Bahr.

Complete discography:
 Pipe Dreams	 Aug 12	·	 1789
 LigAlien – Music by Mari Takano	 Dec 11	·	 CD-1453
 Across the Sea – Chinese-American Flute Concertos	 Oct 11	·	 CD-1739
 Beamish – Orchestral Works	 Jul 10	·	 CD-1601
 Masterworks for Flute and Piano II	 May 10	·	 SACD-1729
 Sharon Bezaly plays Bacri, Bernstein, Dean & Rouse	 Feb 10	·	 CD-1799
 Nicolas Bacri – Sturm und Drang	 Sep 09	·	 CD-1579
 Christopher Rouse – Orchestral Music II	 Sep 09	·	 CD-1586
 Brett Dean – Water Music	 Jul 09	·	 CD-1576
 Schnittke – Concerto grosso No.1 & Symphony No.9
 Remembrance	 May 9	·	 CD-1650
 Whirling Dance – Works for Flute and Traditional Chinese Orchestra	 Mar 09	·	 * SACD-1759
 Spellbound - Sharon Bezaly	 Oct 08	·	 CD-1649
 Barocking together	 Jul 08	·	 CD-1689
 Mozart - Complete Works for Flute and Orchestra	 Feb 08	·	 SACD-1539
 French Delights	 Oct 07	·	 SACD-1639
 Haukur Tómasson – Concertos	 Jun 07	·	 CD-1419
 Uljas Pulkkis - Enchanted Garden	 May 7	·	 SACD-1339
 Seascapes	 Apr 07	·	 SACD-1447
 Bridge across the Pyrenees - Flute Concertos
 Gubaidulina - ... The Deceitful Face of Hope and Despair	 Mar 06	·	 SACD-1449
 Bezaly and Brautigam - Masterworks for Flute and Piano	 Jan 06	·	 SACD-1429
 Nordic Spell - Concertos for Flute and Orchestra	 May 5	·	 CD-1499
 Christian Lindberg - A composer´s portrait	 Mar 05	·	 CD-1428
 Solo Flute from A to Z - Vol.3	 Oct 04	·	 SACD-1459
 Paul Kletzki - Symphony No.3 In memoriam	 Apr 04	·	 CD-1399
 Chamber Music for Flute, Viola and Piano	 Dec 03	·	 CD-1439
 Solo Flute from A to Z - Vol.2	 Apr 03	·	 CD-1259
 Apéritif - A French Collection for Flute and Orchestra	 Nov 02	·	 CD-1359
 Takemitsu - A String Around Autumn	
 Antal Dorati - Night Music	 Jun 02	·	 CD-1099
 Café au lait - Music for Flute and Piano	 Dec 01	·	 CD-1239
 Solo Flute from A to Z - Vol.1	 Apr 01	·	 CD-1159
 Bright Sheng: Flute Moon - China Dreams - Postcards	 Jun 00	·	 CD-1122
 Mozart - Flute Quartets	 May 00	·	 CD-1044
 Flutissimo	 Aug 99	·	 CD-103
 The Israeli Connection - flute and piano	 Nov 98	·	 CD-959
 Rota - Chamber Music	 Jun 97	·	 CD-870

Honors
 Cannes Classical Young Artist of the Year Award, 2003
 Klassic Echo's Instrumentalist of the Year, 2002
 BBC Radio 3 New Generation Artist 2006-2008

Sources
 Minnesota Orchestra's showcase concert magazine, May 6, page 41

References

External links
 Official website

1972 births
Living people
Israeli classical flautists
Jewish classical musicians
Swedish Jews
Women flautists
BBC Radio 3 New Generation Artists
21st-century women musicians
21st-century flautists